John Mayers (born 17 September 1956) is a Barbadian sprinter. He competed in the men's 200 metres at the 1984 Summer Olympics.

References

1956 births
Living people
Athletes (track and field) at the 1984 Summer Olympics
Barbadian male sprinters
Olympic athletes of Barbados
Place of birth missing (living people)